Routhierite is a rare thallium sulfosalt mineral with formula .

It was first described in 1974 for an occurrence in the Jas Roux deposit in the French Alps. It was named after French geologist Pierre Routhier (1916–2008). It is also reported from the Northern Ural Mountains, Russia and the Thunder Bay district of Ontario, Canada.

References

 
mineralatlas.com

Thallium minerals
Mercury(II) minerals
Arsenic minerals
Sulfosalt minerals
Tetragonal minerals
Minerals in space group 107